Western Finncattle are a breed of cattle from western Finland. They are a dual purpose breed, used in dairy and beef production. These cattle are usually red and polled (hornless).

Cows produce approximately 6100 kg of milk with 4.4% fat and 3.5% protein.

References

External links
Western Finncattle at Ark of Taste. www.fondazioneslowfood.com
Western Finncattle at EuReCa. www.regionalcattlebreeds.eu

Cattle breeds originating in Finland
Cattle breeds